10 is an album by English folk musician Kate Rusby, released in 2002. It is a collection of re-recorded and re-mastered songs with some new tracks and live cuts.

Track listing

Personnel

Kate Rusby - vocals, guitar
Lester Simpson, Davy Steele - vocals
Ian Carr, John Doyle, Malcolm Stitt - guitar
John McCusker - banjo, cittern, fiddle, viola, whistle, piano
Alison Brown, Andy Seward - banjo
Jackie Wells - cello
Michael McGoldrick - flute, whistle
Andy Cutting - accordion
Neil Yates - brass
Conrad Ivitsky, Ewen Vernal - bass
Francis MacDonald - drums
James Mackintosh - percussion

References 

Kate Rusby albums
2002 albums